Al-Haratik is a sub-district located in As Sawadiyah District, Al Bayda Governorate, Yemen. Al-Haratik had a population of 2410 according to the 2004 census.

References 

Sub-districts in As Sawadiyah District